Taner Ari (born 29 May 1987) is an Austrian footballer of Turkish descent who plays for Batman Petrolspor as a defender.

Football career
After a brief youth spell in the country of his ancestors with Fenerbahçe SK, Ari returned to Austria and started his career with amateurs FC Blau-Weiß Linz, where he also had started his football formation. In the same level of football, he then played two years in Spain, with UD Norte and UD Fuerteventura.

Ari's first taste of professional football came in 2007, when he played in the Austrian second division for SC Schwanenstadt. Staying in the country, he made his Bundesliga debuts with SC Wiener Neustadt; in early January 2010, however, he switched back to Turkey, signing for second level club Orduspor.

References

External links

 
 
 

1987 births
Living people
Austrian people of Turkish descent
Turkish footballers
Austrian footballers
Association football defenders
Austrian Football Bundesliga players
Austrian expatriate footballers
Expatriate footballers in Spain
Turkish emigrants to Austria
SC Wiener Neustadt players
Orduspor footballers
TKİ Tavşanlı Linyitspor footballers
Ünyespor footballers
Denizlispor footballers
SKN St. Pölten players
FC DAC 1904 Dunajská Streda players
Expatriate footballers in Slovakia
Austrian expatriate sportspeople in Slovakia
Austrian expatriate sportspeople in Spain
People from Erzincan